Chuckle Time is a British television series which was broadcast on Channel 5 in 2018. The show was hosted by comedy duo Barry and Paul Elliott, The Chuckle Brothers. It was based on a similar style to that of You've Been Framed!, America's Funniest Home Videos and Australia's Funniest Home Video Show, where fans upload online videos. It was dubbed by the official press releases as "fails, flops, and funnies”, which The Chuckle Brothers watch and react to. The duo also performed sketches between the clips. It was the duo's final television programme together.

Broadcast
Although twelve episodes were originally scheduled, the series was cut short following the sudden death of Barry Elliott on 5 August 2018 aged 73, meaning only six were broadcast. The final episode was shown in tribute to the comedian. It is unknown whether further episodes were recorded, as it was later stated that Barry had been forced to pull out of filming part-way through due to illness.

Transmissions

References

External links

2018 British television series debuts
2018 British television series endings
2010s British comedy television series
Channel 5 (British TV channel) original programming
English-language television shows
Television series by ITV Studios